Barbara Paulus was the defending champion but lost in the quarterfinals to María Sánchez Lorenzo.

Barbara Schett won in the final 3–6, 6–2, 6–3 against Henrieta Nagyová.

Seeds
A champion seed is indicated in bold text while text in italics indicates the round in which that seed was eliminated.

  Barbara Paulus (quarterfinals)
  Karina Habšudová (first round)
  Judith Wiesner (quarterfinals)
  Patty Schnyder (quarterfinals)
  Barbara Schett (champion)
  Henrieta Nagyová (final)
  Denisa Chládková (second round)
  Virginia Ruano-Pascual (second round)

Draw

External links
 1997 Meta Styrian Open Draw

WTA Austrian Open
1997 WTA Tour